Bess is both a surname and a feminine given name (usually as the shortened Hypocorism form of Elizabeth). Notable people with the name include:

Given name
 Elizabeth I (1533-1603), also known as "Good Queen Bess"
 Bess of Hardwick (1527-1608), daughter of John Hardwick of Hardwicke
 Elizabeth Cavendish, Duchess of Devonshire (1759-1824), early female novelist
 Bess Armstrong (born 1953), American actress
 Elizabeth Austin (disambiguation), several people
 Bess Berman (1902-1968), American record label executive
 Bess Bolden Walcott (1886-1988), African American educator, librarian, museum curator, and activist
 Bess Bonnier (1928-2011), American jazz pianist, composer, and music educator
 Bess Bukodi, British professor
 Elizabeth Davies (disambiguation), several people
 Elizabeth Davis (disambiguation), several people
 Bess Flowers (1898-1984), American actress
 Bess Gearhart Morrison (1875-1968), American actress, educator, and speaker
 Elizabeth Holland (died 1547/8), mistress of Thomas Howard, 3rd Duke of Norfolk
 Bess Houdini (1876-1943), stage assistant and wife of Harry Houdini
 Bess Johnson (c. 1902-1975), American actress
 Bess Larkin Housser Harris (1890-1969), Canadian painter
 Bess Lomax Hawes (1921-2009), American folk musician, folklorist, and researcher
 Bess Meredyth (1890-1969), screenwriter and silent film actress
 Bess Motta (born 1958), American actress, singer, choreographer, and exercise demonstrator
 Bess Myerson (1924-2014), first Jewish Miss America, and politician
 Bess Nkabinde (born 1959), South African judge
 Bess Norriss (1878-1939), Australian artist
 Bess Phipps Dawson (1916-1994), American painter
 Bess Price (born 1960), Aboriginal Australian activist and politician
 Elizabeth Raleigh (1565-1647), wife of Sir Walter Raleigh
 Bess Rogers, American indie rock musician
 Bess Stinson (1902-1996), Arizona state legislator
 Bess Streeter Aldrich (1881-1954), American author
 Bess Taffel (1913-2000), American screenwriter
 Bess Thomas (1892-1968), Australian librarian
 Bess Truitt (1884-1972), Oklahoma Poet Laureate from 1945 to 1946
 Bess Truman (1885-1982), wife of President Harry S. Truman
 Elizabeth Walker (disambiguation), several people
 Bess Whitehead Scott (1890-1997), journalist

Surname
 Brandon Bess (born 1987), West Indies Test cricketer
 Calvin Bess, Bishop of Trinidad and Tobago
Daniel Bess, (born 1977), American television and film actor
 Davone Bess (born 1985), National Football League wide receiver
 Dominic Bess (born 1997), England cricketer
 Georges Bess (born 1947), French comics artist
 Rachel Bess (born c. 1979), American painter
 Rufus Bess (born 1956), former National Football League cornerback

Fictional characters
 Bess, in the opera Porgy and Bess
 Bess Marvin, one of Nancy Drew's closest friends
 Bess, an alternate personality of Jessica Buchanan in the American soap opera One Life to Live
 Elizabeth "Bess" McCord, protagonist of the American drama series Madam Secretary

See also
 Bessie

Feminine given names
Hypocorisms